Una Navidad a Mi Estilo is the eleventh album and first Christmas album of Puerto Rican Salsa singer Víctor Manuelle. The album was released on November 6, 2007. It produced one single, "Yo Traigo la Parranda". The album has sold 49,000 copies in the US.

Track listing 
 Lechón, Lechón, Lechón - (Víctor Manuelle, Rodríguez, Ramón)  
 Yo Me Voy Para Mi Tierra - (Víctor Manuelle, Ruiz, Víctor M.)  
 Los Polvos del Sahara - (Víctor Manuelle, Ruiz, Víctor M.) 
 Amarren al Puerco - (Víctor Manuelle, Rodríguez, Ramón) 
 Navidad en Mi Barrio - (Víctor Manuelle, Ruiz, Víctor M.) 
 La Cama Cortita - (Víctor Manuelle, Betancourt, Casiano)
 Son de Parranda - (Víctor Manuelle, Rodríguez, Ramón)
 Yo Traigo La Parranda - (Víctor Manuelle, Ruiz, Víctor M.)

Charts

Accolades

References 

Víctor Manuelle albums
2007 Christmas albums
Christmas albums by Puerto Rican artists